The Orchard Limestone is a geologic formation in Scotland. It preserves fossils dating back to the Carboniferous period.

See also

 List of fossiliferous stratigraphic units in Scotland

References
 

Carboniferous System of Europe
Carboniferous Scotland
Limestone formations